Halsenbach is an Ortsgemeinde – a municipality belonging to a Verbandsgemeinde, a kind of collective municipality – in the Rhein-Hunsrück-Kreis (district) in Rhineland-Palatinate, Germany. It belongs to the Verbandsgemeinde Hunsrück-Mittelrhein, whose seat is in Emmelshausen.

Geography

Location
The municipality lies in the Hunsrück about 2 km north of Emmelshausen and roughly 7 km west of the Rhine. The municipality's area is 1 003 ha and its elevation is 410 m above sea level.

Constituent communities
Three outlying communities belong to Halsenbach named Ehr, Ehrerheide and Mermicherhof.

History
During building work on the Autobahn A 61 (Ludwigshafen-Koblenz), an Iron Age burying ground was unearthed, and in 1971 a dig was conducted there. The burying ground itself is a group of 13 individual barrows arranged along a trail leading across the Hunsrück and in places the heights along the Rhine, which was expanded in Roman times. For some of the cremations, the barrow was raised right over the charred funeral pyre. Among the grave goods that were worthiest of note were an open-worked belthook and an iron belt ring. The ceramics that were preserved, among them a thrown clay bottle, date the burying ground to the later Hunsrück-Eifel Culture (eras IIA to IIB), or the second fourth of the 5th century BC to the earlier half of the 3rd century BC.

In the Middle Ages, the village belonged to the Gallenscheider Gericht (“Gallenscheid Court”) and thereby, beginning in the 14th century, to the Electorate of Trier. Beginning in 1794, Halsenbach lay under French rule. In 1815 it was assigned to the Kingdom of Prussia at the Congress of Vienna. Since 1946, it has been part of the then newly founded state of Rhineland-Palatinate.

Halsenbach lies almost on the Hunsrückbahn. When this railway was built about 1900, though, “Halsenbach Station” was built so far from the village that a new village quickly sprang up there. Since then, the amalgamation of the outlying centre of Ehr has put Halsenbach itself on the line, and it now has its own station.

Politics

Municipal council
The council is made up of 16 council members, who were elected by majority vote at the municipal election held on 7 June 2009, and the honorary mayor as chairman.

Mayor
Halsenbach's mayor is Rita Lenz.

Coat of arms

The German blazon reads: Das Wappen zeigt in Blau einen golden bekleideten Bischof, wachsend hinter einem roten Schild, darin ein silberner Balken.

The municipality's arms might in English heraldic language be described thus: Azure in base an inescutcheon gules charged with a fess argent, standing behind which a bishop proper vested and mitred Or holding in his dexter hand a book and in his sinister a bishop's staff sable.

The rendition of the arms shown in this section was assembled from the black-and-white version shown at the head of the article with tinctures as prescribed by the German blazon. However, this blazon does not prescribe tinctures for the bishop's staff, book (presumably a Bible) or skin. The first two have been rendered sable (black) and the last “proper” (that is, in natural colour), as this is likely what was intended.

The bishop who stands as the main charge in these arms is Saint Lambert, to whom the village church, built in 1712 and 1713, is consecrated. The inescutcheon with the fess goes back to a seal used by the Schöffen (roughly “lay jurists”) until the late 18th century and thereby refers to Halsenbach's history as the seat of the “Gallscheid Court”.

Culture and sightseeing

Buildings
The following are listed buildings or sites in Rhineland-Palatinate’s Directory of Cultural Monuments:

Halsenbach
 Saint Lambert’s Church (Kirche St. Lambertus), Hinter dem Rathaus 1 – aisleless church, 1758-1759, architect A. Seiz, expansion 1835-1838, north side nave chapel 1896, reconstruction 1923, expansion 1960–62, architect O. Vogel, earlier building’s tower and portal, marked 1713; at the quire a Baroque crucifix; whole complex of buildings with rectory
 Ehrer Straße – graveyard; basalt cross, Baroque Body of Christ; basalt grave cross, 1750
 At Hinter dem Rathaus 2 – wrought-iron cross, 18th century
 Hunsrückbahn (monumental zone) – section of the railway line built in 1906-1908, one of the Prussian State Railway’s steepest lines.
 On Kreisstraße (District Road) 110, northeast of the village – Dörther Brücke; three-arch sandstone-block bridge, 1908

Ehr
 Im Hof 3 – timber-frame house, partly solid, 19th century, addition 19th century

Mermicherhof
 Railway bridge, on Kreisstraße 112 going towards Kratzenburg – stone bridge on the Hunsrückbahn

Economy and infrastructure

Transport
A good kilometre northeast of Emmelshausen, where the bypass road meets the old alignment of the Hunsrückhöhenstraße (“Hunsrück Heights Road”, a scenic road across the Hunsrück built originally as a military road on Hermann Göring’s orders), District Road K108 branches off to the northwest, leading to Halsenbach, Ney and Dieler. In the village centre, District Road K110 coming from Ehr meets Hauptstraße (“Main Street”). To the south, through the Preisbach's deep valley, cross-country paths lead to Liesenfeld and the Baunhöller Mühle (mill).

Established businesses
There are many businesses in the village. In the former factory spaces that once housed the musical instrument manufacturer Wersi, several businesses are now housed.

Further reading
 Hendrik Kelzenberg: Das eisenzeitliche Gräberfeld von Halsenbach, Rhein-Hunsrück-Kreis (Bonner Beiträge zur Vor- und Frühgeschichtlichen Archäologie Band 3, hrsg. Helmuth Roth u. Hans-Eckart Joachim), Bonn 2004.

References

Municipalities in Rhineland-Palatinate
Rhein-Hunsrück-Kreis